Tajae may refer to:

 Tajae, commune in Niger
 Tajae Sharpe (born 1994), American football player